Ehrenfriedersdorf is a town in the district of Erzgebirgskreis, in Saxony, Germany. It is situated 8 km northwest of Annaberg-Buchholz, and 21 km south of Chemnitz.

Theatre
At the start of the 1990s the folk theatre, the Mundarttheater am Greifenstein was founded in Ehrenfriedersdorf. This theatre group took over the tradition of the Mettenspiel, a play as part of the Mettenschicht, which had hitherto been put on by members of the mining fraternity in the buildings of the former tin ord mine of Sauberg .

Sons and daughters of the town
 Johann August Scheibner (1810-1888), politician, Member of Landtag (Kingdom of Saxony)
 Julius Theodor Zenker (1811-1884), orientalist, translator and private scholar
 Georg Fritz Weiß (1822-1893), opera singer, translator and actor
 Max Wenzel (1879-1946), dialect poet of the Erzgebirge 
 Hans Weber (1941-1969), motorcycle racer
 Günter Deckert (nordic combined) (1950-2005), nordic combiner

References

 
Erzgebirgskreis